East Newnan is a census-designated place (CDP) in Coweta County, Georgia, United States. The population was 1,321 at the 2010 census.

Geography

East Newnan is located near the center of Coweta County at  (33.349436, -84.777434). It is bordered to the north and west by the city of Newnan, the county seat. U.S. Route 29 passes through the western part of the CDP, and Interstate 85 forms the CDP's eastern edge, with the closest access being Exit 41 just to the south, where it crosses US 29.

Demographics

As of the census of 2000, there were 1,305 people, 477 households, and 333 families residing in the CDP. The racial makeup of the CDP was 70.88% White, 23.30% African American, 0.31% Native American, 0.23% Pacific Islander, 4.29% from other races, and 1.00% from two or more races. Hispanic or Latino of any race were 8.89% of the population.

There were 477 households, out of which 29.4% had children under the age of 18 living with them, 46.3% were married couples living together, 17.0% had a female householder with no husband present, and 30.0% were non-families. 25.4% of all households were made up of individuals, and 10.3% had someone living alone who was 65 years of age or older.  The average household size was 2.74 and the average family size was 3.22.

In the CDP, the population was spread out, with 24.9% under the age of 18, 10.8% from 18 to 24, 27.9% from 25 to 44, 22.1% from 45 to 64, and 14.3% who were 65 years of age or older.  The median age was 35 years. For every 100 females, there were 104.9 males.  For every 100 females age 18 and over, there were 105.5 males.

The median income for a household in the CDP was $40,208, and the median income for a family was $45,954. Males had a median income of $26,420 versus $20,982 for females. The per capita income for the CDP was $12,464.  About 9.4% of families and 13.2% of the population were below the poverty line, including 11.0% of those under age 18 and 26.9% of those age 65 or over.

References

Census-designated places in Coweta County, Georgia
Census-designated places in Georgia (U.S. state)